This is a partial list of seowon.  The seowon were Korean Confucian institutions which combined the roles of Confucian shrine and academy.

The seowon here are listed according to the province in which they  were located.

Gyeonggi

Chungcheong

Jeolla

Gyeongsang

North Gyeongsang

Gangwon

Hwanghae

Hamgyeong

Pyeongan

Ulsan

References

See also
Education in the Joseon Dynasty
Korean Confucianism
Seowon

References

 
Korean Confucianism
Seowon